Sde Yoav (lit. Yoav's Field) is a kibbutz in southcentral Israel. Located between the cities of Kiryat Gat, Kiryat Malakhi and Ashkelon, it falls under the jurisdiction of Yoav Regional Council.

History
The kibbutz was founded in 1966, and was named after Yitzhak Dubno (nicknamed Yoav) who was killed whilst defending the nearby kibbutz of Negba during the 1948 Arab–Israeli War. 

Sde Yoav was founded on land that had belonged to the depopulated Palestinian  village of Iraq Suwaydan.

Today, similar to many other kibbutzim, Sde Yoav is in the process of privatization.

References

Kibbutzim
Kibbutz Movement
Populated places established in 1956
Populated places in Southern District (Israel)
1956 establishments in Israel